A lemming is a small rodent.

Lemming or Lemmings may also refer to:

Arts, entertainment, and media

Music
 Lemmings (Bachdenkel album), released in 1973
 Lemmings (Jinn album), released in 2007
 "Lemmings", a song by Blink-182 from their 1997 album Dude Ranch
 "Lemmings", a song by English progressive rock band Van der Graaf Generator from the album Pawn Hearts
 The Lemming (formerly known as Lemming), a Dutch glam rock band

Other uses in arts, entertainment, and media
 Lemming (film), a 2005 French film
 Lemmings (advertisement), an Apple Computer TV commercial
 Lemmings (video game), a 1991 computer game with numerous sequels
 National Lampoon's Lemmings, a comedy play and album by National Lampoon
 Several characters in the animated television series Camp Lazlo
 Several characters in the animated television series Grizzy and the Lemmings

Other uses
 Eric Lemming (1880–1930), Swedish athlete